Cannabis in France is illegal for personal use, but remains one of the most popular illegal drugs. Limited types of cannabis-derived products are permitted for medical uses.

History

French Egypt
During Napoléon Bonaparte's invasion of Egypt in 1798, alcohol was not available as Egypt was an Islamic country. In place of alcohol, Bonaparte's troops resorted to trying hashish, which they found to their liking. As a result of the conspicuous consumption of hashish by the troops, the smoking of hashish and consumption of drinks containing it was banned in October 1800, although the troops mostly ignored the order. Subsequently, beverages containing hashish were banned in Egyptian cafes; cafes that sold them were shut down and "boarded up", and their proprietors were jailed. During this time, hashish imported from other countries was destroyed by burning. Upon the end of the occupation in 1801, French troops brought supplies of hashish with them back to France.

Metropolitan France
In the mid-1800s, following travel and studies in Asia, French psychiatrist Jacques-Joseph Moreau studied hashish extensively and produced the 1845 work Du Hachisch et de l'aliénation mentale (Hashish and Mental Illness).

In the 1800s, hashish was embraced in some European literary circles. Most famously, the Club des Hashischins was a Parisian club dedicated to the consumption of hashish and other drugs; its members included authors Théophile Gautier, Moreau de Tours, Victor Hugo, Alexandre Dumas, Charles Baudelaire and Honoré de Balzac. Baudelaire later wrote the 1860 book Les paradis artificiels about the state of being under the influence of opium and hashish.

Legality

In France, possession and use of cannabis fall under criminal law and the Loi du 31 décembre 1970, regarding health measures against drug abuse and suppression of drug trafficking.

Medical cannabis
France is a signatory to the  Geneva Convention on drugs, and accordingly banned cannabis as a medical treatment in 1953. Since then, the importation, sale, transport and production of cannabis and cannabinoids has been illegal in France. In 1999, the Agence Française de Sécurité Sanitaire des Produits de Santé  made  temporary use authorisations for health products otherwise not permitted on the French market. In 1991 a court rejected the demands of the NGO Mouvement pour la Légalization Contrôlée concerning the importation of cannabis to supply 10 patients suffering terminal illness, arguing that such was incompatible with France's adherence to the 1961 UN Single Convention on Narcotic Drugs, and MLC's inability to scientifically control and administer medical cannabis.

As of 8 June 2013, cannabis derivatives can be used in France for the manufacture of medicinal products. The products can only be obtained with a prescription and will only be prescribed when all other medications have failed to effectively relieve suffering. The amended legislation decriminalises "the production, transport, export, possession, offering, acquisition or use of speciality pharmaceutials that contains one of these (cannabis-derivative) substances", while all cannabis products must be approved by the National Medical Safety Agency (Agence nationale de sécurité du médicament – ANSM). A Pharmacists' Union spokesperson explained to the media that the change will make it more straightforward to conduct research into cannabinoids.

In September 2018, the french National Agency for Drug Safety (ANSM) started an experimentation on therapeutic cannabis. They created a scientific committee to evaluate a new public policy and distribution network for specific diseases. This experiment will gather 3,000 patients and provide dried flowers and oils for people going under epilepsy, neuropathic pain or to treat side effects of chemotherapy. The first test should start in September 2020 and will go on for two years.

Because of the coronavirus pandemic, the ANSM informed that the experimentation will be delayed to January 2021.

Reform
On 25 May 2017, the Minister of the Interior indicated his intention to implement reforms, promised by President Emmanuel Macron during his campaign, to substitute citations rather than arrest and trial for use and possession of cannabis. On 23 November 2018 the penalty for possession of cannabis (and other illegal drugs) was reduced to a 200 euro fine, following a 28–14 vote by the National Assembly.
On 1 September 2020, the French Government introduced a 200€ fine for cannabis consumption instead of being taken into custody. This measure will also be applied for cocaine detention. Macron has ruled out legalising cannabis while he is in office and legalisation is also opposed by current government health minister Agnès Buzyn and Interior Minister Gérald Darmanin.

Those that support the legalisation of cannabis in France include Julien Bayou, Benoît Hamon, Yannick Jadot, Jean-Luc Mélenchon, Pierre Person and Aurélien Taché. In 2019, the French think-tank Conseil d'Analyse Economique published a report that recommended legalising cannabis for recreational use in France.

Consumption 

In 2012, 13.4 million French people between age 15 and 64 had tried cannabis, and 1.2 million people in Metropolitan France considered themselves regular users. France ranks fourth in the European Union in terms of monthly consumption (following the Czech Republic, Spain, and Italy) and second only to Denmark in terms of persons who have ever used cannabis.

In 2015, the European Monitoring Centre for Drugs and Drug Addiction published a new report on drugs, saying that the French people were still the biggest cannabis consumers, especially in the 15–34 segment. The report is also affirming that the product quality is increasing, due to competition and technical innovation.

Opinion 
A poll conducted by CSA in November 2013 indicated that, 55% of French people were opposed to the decriminalisation  of cannabis, while 44% said that the prohibition on cannabis is an abridgment of individual liberty.

In June 2018, an IFOP poll for Terra Nova and Echo Citoyen found that 51% were in favour of a regulated market in cannabis, and 40% were opposed.

At the end of 2018, a poll by the French Observatory of Drugs and Addiction, a government body, found "nearly one in two" were favourable to legalisation with 54% opposed, while more than 9 in 10 were in favour of legalising medical cannabis.

See also
 Hemp in France
 NORML France
 FAAAT think & do tank

References

 
Drug policy of France